The Chairman of the Kursk Oblast Duma is the presiding officer of that legislature.

Below is a list of office-holders:

Sources 
Kursk Oblast Duma

Lists of legislative speakers in Russia
Politics of Kursk Oblast